The following is a list of notable events that have happened in 2012 in music in New Zealand.

Events

January

February

March

April

May

June

July
On July 28, Colin Horsley died.

August

September
Herbs (band) and Toy Love were inducted into the New Zealand Music Hall of Fame.

October
The 2012 New Zealand Music Awards took place on October 3. The ceremony awarded 26 awards for various musical accomplishments.
Concord Dawn's Air Chrysalis won the 2012 New Zealand Music Award for Best Electronica Album

November

December

Albums and Singles

January

February

March

April

May

June

July

August

September

October

November

December

Deaths
July 28 – Colin Horsley, pianist and educator, 92

See also
New Zealand top 50 singles of 2012
New Zealand top 50 albums of 2012

References